The Pine River is a  river in the Lower Peninsula of the U.S. state of Michigan. The Pine River is a tributary of the Chippewa River and is thus part of the Saginaw River drainage basin.

It flows southeast into southwest Isabella County. It turns south through northeast Montcalm County and Gratiot County, where it turns to the northeast, continuing through the cities of Alma and St. Louis. It enters Midland County and joins the Chippewa River at  approximately two miles before the Chippewa joins the Tittabawassee River on the west side of the city of Midland.

The river was contaminated by the Michigan Chemical Corporation (later Velsicol Chemical Corporation) in St. Louis and has been subject to extensive clean-up efforts.

Tributaries and features 
 (left) Sucker Creek
 (left) Bush Creek
 (right) Taylor Drain
 (left) Rook Drain
 (left) Horse Creek
 (right) Sugar Creek
 (right) Honeyoey Creek
 (left) Coles Creek
 Peterman Lake
 Madison Lake
 (left) Newark and Arcadia Drain
 (left) Carpenter Creek
 (left) Twin Lake
 (left) Robbins Lake
 (left) Deaner Lake
 (right) Mud Creek
 (left) Bass Lake Drain
 (right) North Branch Pine River
 (left) Cedar Drain
 (right) Thatcher Creek
 (left) Wolf Creek
 (right) Offnear Lake
 (left) Cedar Lake
 (right) Marl Lake
 (left) Skunk Creek
 (left) South Branch Pine River
 Blanchard Millpond
 (left) Decker Creek
 (right) Jewel Creek
 (right) Pony Creek
 (left) Halls Lake
 (right) Big Eldred Lake
 Little Eldred Lake
 (left) Miller Creek
 Meeker Lake
 Pine Lake

Drainage basin 

 Gratiot County
 City of Alma
 Arcada Township
 Bethany Township
 Emerson Township
 New Haven Township
 Newark Township
 Pine River Township
 City of St. Louis
 Seville Township
 Sumner Township
 Wheeler Township
 Isabella County
 Broomfield Township
 Fremont Township
 Lincoln Township
 Rolland Township
 Mecosta County
 Millbrook Township
 Wheatland Township
 Midland County
 Homer Township
 Jasper Township
 Lee Township
 Mount Haley Township
 Porter Township
 Montcalm County
 Richland Township
 Ferris Township
 Home Township

References 

Rivers of Michigan
Rivers of Gratiot County, Michigan
Rivers of Isabella County, Michigan
Rivers of Midland County, Michigan
Rivers of Montcalm County, Michigan
Rivers of Mecosta County, Michigan
Tributaries of Lake Huron